Iosua Opeta (born August 15, 1996) is an American football guard for the Philadelphia Eagles of the National Football League (NFL). After playing college football for Weber State, he was signed by the Eagles as an undrafted free agent in 2019.

Early life
Opeta was born in Utah and grew up in Stansbury Park after moving to the town when he was eight. He began playing football at the age of ten. In high school, Opeta played defense and offense. He signed with Weber State over an offer from Southern Utah because Weber State wanted him on the defensive line.

College career
Opeta was a member of the Weber State Wildcats for five seasons, redshirting as a true freshman. He played defensive tackle as a redshirt freshman before moving to the offensive line during the following offseason because he was promised a starting role. In his first year as an offensive lineman, Opeta was an honorable mention All-Conference. Opeta was named an FCS All-American twice. He was named to the NFLPA Collegiate Bowl.

Professional career
At the NFL Scouting Combine, Opeta put up 39 reps of 225 pounds on bench press, the most out of any offensive linemen. After going undrafted in 2019, Opeta was signed by the Philadelphia Eagles for training camp. He spent the first 12 weeks on the practice squad. On December 3, he was promoted to the active roster.

On September 5, 2020, Opeta was waived by the Eagles and was signed to their practice squad the next day. He was elevated to the active roster on September 12 for the team's week 1 game against the Washington Football Team and reverted to the practice squad on September 14. He was promoted to the active roster on September 15. He was placed on injured reserve on November 28, 2020.

On August 31, 2021, Opeta was waived by the Eagles and re-signed to the practice squad the next day. He was signed to the active roster on September 29, 2021.

Opeta played in seven games for the Eagles in 2022, and was made a healthy scratch for the team’s Week 17 game against the New Orleans Saints. He was waived by the team on January 6, 2023, prior to the team’s season finale against the New York Giants, and re-signed to the practice squad.

References

External links
Weber State Wildcats bio
Philadelphia Eagles bio
NFL.com draft profile

1996 births
Living people
American people of Samoan descent
People from Tooele County, Utah
Players of American football from Utah
American football offensive guards
Weber State Wildcats football players
Philadelphia Eagles players